Larry Richard (born 23 April 1965) is former professional basketball player from United States who played for Eczacıbaşı B.K., 2 years with Fenerbahçe and 3 years with Efes Pilsen SK. He played as center and 2.02 m.

Honors
Turkish League
 1988, 1989 with Eczacıbaşı
 1991 with Fenerbahçe
 1993, 1994 with Efes Pilsen S.K.
Turkish Cup
 1994 with Efes Pilsen S.K.
President's Cup
 1988 with Eczacıbaşı
 1990, 1991 with Fenerbahçe
 1992, 1993 with Efes Pilsen S.K.
European Cup runner-up
 1993 with Efes Pilsen S.K.

References

External links
TBLStat.net Profile

1965 births
Living people
African-American basketball players
American expatriate basketball people in Turkey
American men's basketball players
Anadolu Efes S.K. players
Eczacıbaşı S.K. (men's basketball) players
Fenerbahçe men's basketball players
TCU Horned Frogs men's basketball players
21st-century African-American people
20th-century African-American sportspeople